is a rhythm video game developed and published by Konami for the Nintendo DS in 2010. It was released exclusively in Japan under the Pop'n Music series. The game plays with the system held in "book style" as the player interacts with falling notes using the stylus. The name 'Utacchi' is a portmanteau of the Japanese words "uta", meaning 'song', and "tachi", a loan word from English meaning 'touch'.

Gameplay

Utacchi plays like other Bemani games, where notes travel down lanes into a judgement area. When the note reaches the center of the judgement area, one of four actions must be taken based on the note's color:

To pass a song, the player must finish with at least 2/3 of the life bar full. As in other rhythm games, this is raised by hitting notes in time with the music. There are three timing grades: Good, Okay, and Boo. The first two will raise your life bar, while the last will deplete it.

Difficulty

The number of lanes possible are 1, 3, and 5. On 1 and 3 lane mode, there are two sub-difficulties, Simple and Difficult. 5 lane mode can only be played on Difficult.

Game Modes

Normal Play uses the gameplay listed above. Each note is part of the vocal track.

Vocal Play uses the same game play as above but player recorded audio replaces the vocal track. It is pitch shifted to match the song.

Karaoke uses the microphone to detect when the player is singing.  Judging is based on the presence of sound, not on pitch. Karaoke uses the 5 lane notechart.

Track listing
The following songs are unlocked at the beginning of the game:

Multiplayer
Up to 4 people can play together using link play or download play.

References

External links
Official site

2010 video games
Japan-exclusive video games
Konami games
Nintendo DS games
Nintendo DS-only games
Bemani games
Music video games
Video games developed in Japan